Lauri Tapani Vilkko (13 August 1925 – 13 October 2017) was a Finnish modern pentathlete who competed in the 1948 Summer Olympics and in the 1952 Summer Olympics. He won a bronze medal in the team event in 1952. He was a military officer who retired as a colonel in 1985 having worked as a chief of the topography department in the Finnish Army.

References

1925 births
2017 deaths
Finnish male modern pentathletes
Olympic modern pentathletes of Finland
Modern pentathletes at the 1948 Summer Olympics
Modern pentathletes at the 1952 Summer Olympics
Olympic bronze medalists for Finland
Olympic medalists in modern pentathlon
People from Rautjärvi
Medalists at the 1952 Summer Olympics
Sportspeople from South Karelia